Lameirão is a village in the northern part of the island of Sao Vicente, Cape Verde. It is situated in the hills east of the island capital Mindelo, approximately 3 km southeast of the city centre and west of Monte Verde.

References

Villages and settlements in São Vicente, Cape Verde